This article lists the episodes and short summaries of the 46th to 69th and 72nd episodes of the  anime series, known in the English dub as the fourth season of Ranma ½ or "Outta Control".

Rumiko Takahashi's manga series Ranma ½ was adapted into two anime series: Ranma ½ which ran on Fuji TV for 18 episodes and Ranma ½ Nettōhen which ran for 143. The first TV series was canceled due to low ratings in September 1989, but was then brought back in December as the much more popular and much longer-running Ranma ½ Nettōhen.

Viz Media licensed both anime for English dubs and labeled them as one. They released them in North America in seven DVD collections they call "seasons". Nettōhen episodes 46 to 69 (excluding 51) and 72 are season 4, which was given the title "Outta Control". Episode 51 was inserted as episode 63 of season 3 and episode 72 was inserted into this season as episode 88, while 70 and 71 are in season 5.

The English dub only uses "Friends" as a closing, "Present" was never actually heard in the English dub.



Episode list
Note: Episode 51 was not included in Viz's season 4 release, but in season 3. It is shown below for proper chronological purposes.

References
 Ranma ½ Perfect Edition Anime Episode Summaries

1990 Japanese television seasons
1991 Japanese television seasons
Season 4